Stara Rega is a river of Poland. It is a tributary of Rega river near Słonowice.

Rivers of Poland
Rivers of West Pomeranian Voivodeship